Moabe Platini Dias Ramos (born 22 June 1987) is a Brazilian football player.

Club statistics

References

External links

Oita Trinita

1987 births
Living people
Brazilian footballers
Brazilian expatriate footballers
Expatriate footballers in Japan
J1 League players
União São João Esporte Clube players
Oita Trinita players
MIO Biwako Shiga players
Association football midfielders
Footballers from São Paulo